The Frick Building is one of the major distinctive and recognizable features of Downtown Pittsburgh, Pennsylvania, United States. The tower was built by and is named for Henry Clay Frick, an industrialist coke producer who created a portfolio of commercial buildings in Pittsburgh. The building is listed on the National Register of Historic Places.

The tower was built next to a building owned by his business partner-turned-rival Andrew Carnegie, on the site of Saint Peter Episcopal Church. Frick, who feuded with Carnegie after they split as business associates, had the building designed to be taller than Carnegie's in order to encompass it in constant shadow.

The Frick Building was opened on March 15, 1902, and originally had 20 floors. It was the tallest building in the city at that time.  A leveling of the surrounding landscape that was completed in 1912 caused the basement to become the entrance, so some sources credit the building with 21 stories. It rises 330 feet (101 m) above Downtown Pittsburgh. Its address is 437 Grant Street, and is also accessible from Forbes and Fifth Avenues.

The building's architect was Daniel H. Burnham of D.H. Burnham & Company, Chicago. Of the eleven executed designs for Pittsburgh by D.H. Burnham & Company, the Frick Building is one of only seven survivors.

The top floor, which was reserved for The Union Club of Pittsburgh, includes a balcony around the perimeter of the building, a high, handcrafted ceiling, and heavy, elaborate brass door fixtures. Originally, H.C. Frick used it as his personal office and as a meeting place and social club for wealthy industrialists. On the 19th floor was Frick's personal shower. At the time, no other shower had been built that high above ground level, because water could not easily be pumped that high with the technology of the time. The shower, non-functioning, still exists on the 19th floor today. 

Fittingly for a building created for a man who vowed to be a millionaire by age thirty, the lobby features an elegant stained-glass window by John LaFarge, depicting "Fortune and Her Wheel" (1902).  The two bronze sentinel lions (1904) in the lobby were created by sculptor Alexander Proctor. A bust of Frick by sculptor Malvina Hoffman (1923) is displayed in the rear lobby, which extends from Forbes to Fifth Avenue.

For a time, the building was home to the headquarters for Frick's family whiskey business, Old Overholt. The headquarters oversaw a network of sales offices around the United States.

References

Further reading

 Glenn A. Walsh (2001) History of Industrialist, Art Patron, and Philanthropist Henry Clay Frick Retrieved 2005-09-20.
 Mellon Square Map Retrieved 2005-09-20.
 Chris Potter (2005) You Had To Ask Archives Retrieved 2005-09-20.

External links 

 Frick Building at Emporis

Commercial buildings on the National Register of Historic Places in Pennsylvania
Skyscraper office buildings in Pittsburgh
Commercial buildings completed in 1902
Pittsburgh History & Landmarks Foundation Historic Landmarks
National Register of Historic Places in Pittsburgh